Liberté Dembaya is a commune in the Cercle of Kayes in the Kayes Region of south-western Mali, near the border of Senegal. The main village (chef-lieu) is Diala Banlieue. In 2009 the commune had a population of 13,074.

References

External links
.

Communes of Kayes Region